Z27 may refer to:

German destroyer Z27, Type 1936A-class destroyer built for the Kriegsmarine during World War II
New South Wales Z27 class locomotive (formally G.1204 class), a class of steam locomotives built  for the New South Wales Government Railways of Australia
Small nucleolar RNA snoR31/Z110/Z27, a non-coding RNA (ncRNA) molecule which functions in the modification of other small nuclear RNAs (snRNAs)